The Harvey M. Davey House is a historic house in Coeur d'Alene, Idaho. It was built in 1908 for Harvey M. Davey, a general contractor who oversaw the construction of many buildings in the area. According to historian Nancy F. Renk, "The Davey house remains significant today because it has been changed so little over the years." It has been listed on the National Register of Historic Places since May 23, 1985.

References

		
National Register of Historic Places in Kootenai County, Idaho
Houses completed in 1908
Buildings and structures in Coeur d'Alene, Idaho